Holbrook is a masculine given name and a surname. It may refer to:

Surname
Amory Holbrook (1820–1866), American attorney and politician in the Oregon Territory
Anna Kathryn Holbrook (born 1957), American soap opera actress
Bill Holbrook (born 1958), American comic strip artist
Boyd Holbrook (born 1980 or 1981), American film and television actor
Chad Holbrook (born 1971), American college baseball coach
Charles R. Holbrook III (born 1938), American politician
David Holbrook (1923–2011), British writer
Eddie Holbrook, American former college men's basketball head coach
Edward Dexter Holbrook (1836–1870), a congressional delegate from the Idaho Territory
Elizabeth Bradford Holbrook (1913–2009), Canadian portrait sculptor
Florence Holbrook (1860–1932), American educator, writer, pacifist
Frank Kinney Holbrook (c. 1874–1916), first African-American intercollegiate athlete at the University of Iowa
Frederick Holbrook (1813–1909), American politician and 27th Governor of Vermont
Hal Holbrook (1925–2021), American actor
Henry Holbrook (1820–1902), English-born merchant and politician in British Columbia
Jarita Holbrook (born 1965), American astronomer
John Holbrook (bishop) (born 1962), Anglican bishop
John Holbrook (publisher) (1761–1838), American publisher and entrepreneur
John Edwards Holbrook (1796–1871), American zoologist, herpetologist, physician and naturalist
Joseph Holbrook (1806–1885), Mormon pioneer in Utah
Josiah Holbrook (1788–1854), founder of the Lyceum movement in the United States
Julian Holbrook (1897–1980), British Army brigadier
Justin Holbrook (born 1976), Australian rugby league head coach
Karen Holbrook (born 1942), former president of Ohio State University
Leonard Holbrook (1882–1974), British Royal Navy rear admiral, brother of Norman Douglas Holbrook
Lucius Roy Holbrook (1875–1952), American major general
Norman Douglas Holbrook (1888–1976), British Royal Navy commander and recipient of the Victoria Cross, brother of Leonard Holbrook
Percy Holbrook (1859–1946), British priest
Rick Holbrook (1948–2007), American Olympic weightlifter
Sam Holbrook (born 1965), Major League Baseball umpire
Sammy Holbrook (1910–1991), Major League Baseball catcher
Steve Holbrook (born 1952), English former footballer
Stewart Holbrook (1893–1964), American writer
Teri Holbrook, American mystery writer
Terry Holbrook (born 1945), English football referee
Terry Holbrook (ice hockey) (born 1950), Canadian former ice hockey player
Thomas Holbrook (born 1949), American politician
Willard Ames Holbrook Jr. (1898–1986), American major general

Given name
Holbrook Blinn (1872–1928), American stage and film actor
Holbrook Gaskell (1813–1909), British industrialist
Holbrook Jackson (1874–1948), British journalist, writer and publisher
Holbrook Working (1895–1985), American professor of economics and statistics at Stanford University’s Food Research Institute

English masculine given names